Daniel Sillman (born 1989) is an American sports executive, entrepreneur and film producer. He is the CEO of Relevent Sports Group (RSG), a live soccer events and media company that owns and operates the International Champions Cup (ICC). Sillman was executive producer of the ESPN documentary about Ada Hegerberg, My Name is Ada Hegerberg; and the Netflix docuseries about Brazilian soccer star Neymar, The Perfect Chaos.

Career 
Sillman founded Compass Management Group, while a student at the University of Michigan, which offered financial services to athletes and entertainers, including Brandon Graham, who later played for the Philadelphia Eagles.

After selling Compass in 2014, Sillman joined RSE Ventures, a private investment firm owned by Stephen M. Ross. In 2017 he led the strategy to bring El Clásico, a soccer match between Barcelona and Real Madrid, to the US in pre-season for the first time, and outside of Spain for the second time in 100 years. Following the match, in July 2017 Sillman became the CEO of RSG.

Sillman led the creation of the Women's International Champions Cup and the International Champions Cup Futures tournament.

In August 2018 Sillman negotiated a 15-year joint venture deal on behalf of RSG with La Liga, with the goal of promoting soccer in Canada and the US. In 2020, Sillman as part of the JV negotiated an eight-year, $1.4 billion broadcast deal between LaLiga and ESPN, the largest broadcast rights deal for a foreign league in US history. Also in 2020, the JV expanded to include Mexico.

Sillman is executive producer of the 2020 full-length documentary on ESPN about the Norwegian female soccer player Ada Hegerberg, My Name is Ada Hegerberg. He is an executive producer on the Netflix docuseries about Brazilian soccer star Neymar, The Perfect Chaos.

In June 2021, the JV between Relevent Sports Group and LaLiga announced an eight-year, $1.4 billion broadcast deal to stream all 380 La Liga matches on ESPN Plus, with some televised on ESPN’s networks. In November 2021, the JV reached an eight-year extension with Televisa to broadcast LaLiga in Mexico, worth $560 million.

In February 2022, UEFA awarded Relevent Sports Group to act as UEFA and the European Club Association’s sales agent for US media rights of UEFA club competition. In August 2022, Paramount reached a 6-year deal with UEFA valued at $1.5 billion, more than 2.5 times the value of the prior deal.

Sillman was included on the Forbes “30 Under 30 2018: Sports” list, Sports Business Journal's 2019 “Forty Under 40” list, and Leaders Under 40 2022 list.

Sillman is a long time business partner with 3-time NBA Champion Draymond Green.

In September 2022, Major League Pickleball announced Daniel Sillman, along with LeBron James, Kevin Love, Draymond Green, Maverick Carter, Paul Rivera and SC Holdings had purchased a pickleball franchise.

References

External links
Daniel Sillman at IMDb

1989 births
American chief executives in the media industry
Businesspeople from Detroit
Living people